Andrew Robb Love (26 March 1905 – 3 November 1962) was a Scottish professional football winger who played for Aberdeen, Aldershot and Montrose.

Love began his senior career at Aberdeen in 1925, signing from Kirkintilloch Rob Roy. He played 240 games for Aberdeen, before moving to Aldershot in 1935.

Love won three Scotland caps in 1931, scoring once against Switzerland.

Career statistics

Club

Appearances and goals by club, season and competition

International 

Scores and results list Scotland's goal tally first, score column indicates score after each Love goal

References

Sources

1905 births
1962 deaths
People from Renfrew
Association football wingers
Scottish footballers
Aberdeen F.C. players
Scottish Football League players
Scotland international footballers
Aldershot F.C. players
Kirkintilloch Rob Roy F.C. players
Montrose F.C. players
Scottish Football League representative players